The Heart of St. Pauli is a 1957 West German musical film directed by Eugen York and starring Hans Albers, Hansjörg Felmy and Jürgen Wilke. The film is set in the St. Pauli district of Hamburg and was an attempt to capitalise on the success of Alber's earlier starring role in Große Freiheit Nr. 7. It was made by the Hamburg-based studio Real Film and shot at the Wandsbek Studios and on location in the city. The film's sets were designed by the art directors Mathias Matthies and Ellen Schmidt.

Cast

References

Bibliography 
 Hake, Sabine. Popular Cinema of the Third Reich. University of Texas Press, 2001.

External links 
 

1957 films
1957 musical films
1957 crime films
German musical films
German crime films
West German films
1950s German-language films
Films directed by Eugen York
Films set in Hamburg
Films shot in Hamburg
1950s German films
Films shot at Wandsbek Studios